A naive B cell is a B cell that has not been exposed to an antigen. These are located in the tonsils, spleen, primary lymphoid follicles in lymph nodes

Once exposed to an antigen, the naive B cell either becomes a memory B cell or a plasma cell that secretes antibodies specific to the antigen that was originally bound. Plasma cells do not last long in the circulation, this is in contrast to memory cells that last for very long periods of time. Memory cells do not secrete antibody until activated by their specific antigen.

Notes and references 

B cells
Lymphocytes
Human cells
Immunology
Immune system